Oophytum is a genus of succulent plants native to South Africa. Both species are endemic to the Knersvlakte. 
Egg-shaped Oophytum plants develop two leaves opposite each other per season.  At the end of winter the outer pair forms a sheath from which the new pair of leaves develop. Water cells are visible on the soft leaves giving them a shimmering appearance. The flowers, produced in winter, are white, pink, or a combination of both.

The genus contains two accepted species:
Oophytum nanum
Oophytum oviforme

References

 Oophytum Plants in the Knersvlakte 
The Plant List

Flora of South Africa
Aizoaceae
Aizoaceae genera
Taxa named by N. E. Brown